Palpita minuscula is a moth in the family Crambidae. It was described by Inoue in 1996. It is found in China (Guangdong, Guangxi, Hong Kong).

References

Moths described in 1996
Palpita
Moths of Asia